Octavio Echeverri (born 22 March 1931) is a Colombian former cyclist. He competed in the time trial and team pursuit events at the 1956 Summer Olympics.

References

External links
 

1931 births
Possibly living people
Colombian male cyclists
Olympic cyclists of Colombia
Cyclists at the 1956 Summer Olympics
Medalists at the 1955 Pan American Games
Cyclists at the 1955 Pan American Games
Pan American Games silver medalists for Colombia
Pan American Games medalists in cycling
20th-century Colombian people
21st-century Colombian people